Wittmackia is a genus of flowering plants in the family Bromeliaceae.

The genus name of Wittmackia is in honour of Ludwig Wittmack (1839–1929), a German botanist. 
The genus was first described and published in C.F.P.von Martius & auct. suc. (eds.), Fl. Bras. Vol.3 (Issue 3) on page 274 in 1891.

Its native range stretches down from Mexico, through Central America to Tropical America, including parts of the Caribbean. They are found in Bahamas, Brazil, Cayman Islands, Costa Rica, Cuba, French Guiana, Guyana, Jamaica, Leeward Islands, Panamá, Puerto Rico, Suriname, Trinidad-Tobago, Turks-Caicos Islands, Venezuela, Venezuelan Antilles and Windward Islands.

Known species 
, Kew's Plants of the World Online listed the following species:

 Wittmackia abbreviata (L.B.Sm. & Proctor) Aguirre-Santoro
 Wittmackia altocaririensis (Leme & L.Kollmann) Aguirre-Santoro
 Wittmackia amorimii (Leme) Aguirre-Santoro
 Wittmackia andersoniana (Leme & H.Luther) Aguirre-Santoro
 Wittmackia antillana (Mez) Aguirre-Santoro
 Wittmackia bicolor (L.B.Sm.) Aguirre-Santoro
 Wittmackia brasiliensis (E.Pereira & I.A.Penna) Aguirre-Santoro
 Wittmackia burle-marxii (E.Pereira) Aguirre-Santoro
 Wittmackia canaliculata (Leme & H.Luther) Aguirre-Santoro
 Wittmackia carvalhoi (Martinelli & Leme) Aguirre-Santoro, syn. Ronnbergia carvalhoi Martinelli & Leme
 Wittmackia caymanensis (Britton ex L.B.Sm.) Aguirre-Santoro
 Wittmackia distans (Griseb.) Aguirre-Santoro
 Wittmackia eriostachya (Mez) Aguirre-Santoro
 Wittmackia fawcettii (Mez) Aguirre-Santoro
 Wittmackia froesii (L.B.Sm.) Aguirre-Santoro
 Wittmackia gregaria (Leme & L.Kollmann) Aguirre-Santoro
 Wittmackia incompta (Leme & H.Luther) Aguirre-Santoro
 Wittmackia inermis (Mez) Aguirre-Santoro
 Wittmackia ituberaensis (Leme & L.Kollmann) Aguirre-Santoro
 Wittmackia jamaicana (L.B.Sm. & Proctor) Aguirre-Santoro
 Wittmackia laesslei (L.B.Sm.) Aguirre-Santoro
 Wittmackia laevigata (Leme) Aguirre-Santoro
 Wittmackia limae (Leme) Aguirre-Santoro
 Wittmackia lingulata (L.) Mez
 Wittmackia lingulatoides (Leme & H.Luther) Aguirre-Santoro
 Wittmackia linharesiorum (Leme) Aguirre-Santoro
 Wittmackia maranguapensis (Leme & Scharf) Aguirre-Santoro
 Wittmackia mesoamericana (I.Ramírez, Carnevali & Cetzal) Aguirre-Santoro
 Wittmackia negrilensis (Britton ex L.B.Sm.) Aguirre-Santoro
 Wittmackia neoregelioides (Leme) Aguirre-Santoro, syn. Ronnbergia neoregelioides Leme
 Wittmackia patentissima (Mart. ex Schult. & Schult.f.) Mez
 Wittmackia penduliflora (A.Rich.) Aguirre-Santoro
 Wittmackia pendulispica (Leme & L.Kollmann) Aguirre-Santoro
 Wittmackia pernambucentris (J.A.Siqueira & Leme) Aguirre-Santoro
 Wittmackia polycephala (Baker) Aguirre-Santoro
 Wittmackia portoricensis (Mez) Aguirre-Santoro
 Wittmackia rohan-estyi (Proctor, Aguirre-Santoro & K.Campbell) Aguirre-Santoro
 Wittmackia silvana (Leme) Aguirre-Santoro, syn. Ronnbergia silvana Leme
 Wittmackia spinulosa (Mez) Aguirre-Santoro
 Wittmackia sulbahianensis (Leme, Amorim & J.A.Siqueira) Aguirre-Santoro
 Wittmackia tentaculifera (Leme, Amorim & J.A.Siqueira) Aguirre-Santoro
 Wittmackia turbinocalyx (Mez) Aguirre-Santoro
 Wittmackia urbaniana (Mez) Aguirre-Santoro
 Wittmackia viridostigma (Leme & H.Luther) Aguirre-Santoro

References

 
Flora of South America
Bromeliaceae genera